The District Court of the Virgin Islands (in case citations, D.V.I.) is a United States territorial court with jurisdiction over federal and diversity actions in the United States Virgin Islands, a United States territory and more specifically an insular area that is an unincorporated organized territory. The court sits in both St. Croix and St. Thomas. Unlike United States district courts, judges on the District Court of the Virgin Islands do not have life tenure, as the court is not an Article III court. Instead, the court is an Article IV court, created pursuant to Congress's Article IV, Section 3 powers. Appeals of the court's decisions are taken to the United States Court of Appeals for the Third Circuit in Philadelphia.

The District Court used to have jurisdiction over all local civil actions brought in the Virgin Islands, but in 1976 the Virgin Islands Legislature—as allowed by the Revised Organic Act of 1954—gave a portion of this jurisdiction to the former Territorial Court of the Virgin Islands, at that time the local trial court.  The jurisdiction of the Territorial Court was expanded to all civil actions in 1990.  Similarly, the Legislature gave the Territorial Court jurisdiction over certain criminal actions brought under Virgin Islands law in 1985 and expanded that jurisdiction to all criminal cases in 1993, although the United States Attorney may still bring certain criminal actions in the District Court in some circumstances. In 2004 the Territorial Court was renamed the Superior Court of the Virgin Islands. 

Before the creation of the Supreme Court of the Virgin Islands in 2007, the Appellate Division of the District Court heard appeals from the Superior Court in three-judge panels. From 2007, the Supreme Court hears these appeals exclusively, with its decisions subject to review by the United States Supreme Court if that court decides to grant certiorari.

The current United States Attorney for  the District of the Virgin Islands is Delia L. Smith.

Current judges 
:

Vacancy and pending nomination

Former judges

See also 
 Courts of the United States
 List of current United States district judges
 List of United States federal courthouses in the Virgin Islands
 Politics of the United States Virgin Islands

References

External links 
 District Court of the Virgin Islands

Politics of the United States Virgin Islands
Political organizations based in the United States Virgin Islands
Virgin Islands
1936 establishments in the United States Virgin Islands
Courts and tribunals established in 1936